The 2009 Old Dominion Monarchs baseball team represents Old Dominion University in the 2009 NCAA Division I baseball season. The Monarchs play their home games at Bud Metheny Baseball Complex, which was named for former coach Bud Metheny.

The 2009 Monarchs compiled a losing record for the second year in a row but were still able to earn a berth to the CAA tournament with a 13–11 conference mark. The team played against three ranked teams during the season; #17 South Carolina, #20 ECU, and #29 George Mason losing each time.

The season started at the Wake Forest tournament where they went 2–2 with wins against Marshall and Akron. In conference play ODU won their series against James Madison, Hofstra, William & Mary, and sweeping rival VCU.

Third baseman Jake McAloose led the team in batting average hitting .413 which is the 9th highest single-season batting average in ODU history. His remarkable offensive season and fielding .965 earned him 1st team All-CAA and 2nd team ABCA All-Region. Freshman OF/RHP Brett Harris earned Freshman All-American honors as well.

Drafted Players

Joe Velleggia - Baltimore Orioles

References

Old Dominion
Old Dominion Monarchs baseball seasons
Old Dominion baseball